was a Japanese photographer.

He was born in Kyōbashi-ku, Tokyo, on 25 July 1883, as the fourth son of Arinobu Fukuhara, the head of Apothecary Shiseidō (which in 1927 would be incorporated as Shiseidō) and Toku Fukuhara. The third brother predeceased his birth, so he was named and treated as the third son. His two other elder brothers also died young, but the next brother, Rosō, would also win fame as a photographer; and, to a lesser degree, his youngest brother Nobuyoshi (信義, b.1897) would too, under the name Tōru Namiki.

Fukuhara first used a camera in 1896, if not earlier. He went to Columbia University to study pharmacology in 1908, and after his graduation traveled around England, Germany and Italy before settling in Paris in 1913. While there he certainly viewed much art and is likely to have seen various exhibitions of post-Impressionist works; Iizawa sees the influence of artists such as Seurat in Fukuhara's photographs later collected as "Paris and the Seine."

Fukuhara died on 4 November 1948.

Photograph series by Fukuhara

Paris and the Seine

Pari to Seinu / Paris et la Seine. Shashin Geijutsusha, 1922. Facsimile ed. Tokyo: Kokushokankōkai, 2007. . New ed. JPS, 1935.  Online at Shiseido)

The twenty-four plates are also shown in Yamada, pp. 5–29.

Paris and the Seine, continued

The ten plates of Le nouveau Paris et la Seine were published one per month in the magazine Shashin Geijutsu, from November 1922 through September 1923 (there was a break in January). They are shown in Yamada, pp. 30–44.

Hikari to Sono Kaichō

Fukuhara Shinzō Shashin Gashū: Hikari to Sono Kaichō. Shashin Geijutsusha, 1923. 
Shinpen fūkei. Shiseido, 1930. 

Fourteen plates are shown in Yamada, pp. 55–82.

West Lake

Saiko fūkei / Beautiful West Lake. Tokyo: JPS, 1931. A collection of twenty-four numbered plates (about 16×21 cm), and one smaller plate as a frontispiece. A supplementary title page announces the book in English as Light with It Harmony; it has no Japanese-language counterpart. (online at Shiseido).

Matsue

Matsue fūkei / The Old Town of Matsue. JPS, 1935.  (online at Shiseido)

Hawai'i

Hawai fūkei / The Sunny Hawaii. JPS, 1937. (online at Shiseido)

Texts by Fukuhara

Tabi no shashin satsuei annai. Asahi Shinbunsha, 1937. 
Fukuhara Shinzō zuihitsu: Shashin o kataru. Musashi Shobō, 1943. 
Fukuhara Shinzō ronsetsu: Shashin geijutsu. Musashi Shobō, 1943.

Notes

References and further reading

 Fukuhara Shinzō. Ed. . Shiseido, 1970. 
 Fukuhara Shinzō, Fukuhara Rosō: Hikari to sono kaichō (Shinzō Fukuhara, Rosō Fukuhara: Light and its harmony). Nikon Salon Books 3. Tokyo: Nikkor Club, 1977.  
 Fukuhara Shinzō to bijutsu to Shiseidō ten / Shinzo Fukuhara: Art and Shiseido. Tokyo: Setagaya Art Museum, 2007.  Catalogue of an exhibition held at the museum in 2007, concentrating more on Fukuhara's influence than on his own works. Despite the alternative title, in Japanese only.
 Fukuhara Shinzō to Fukuhara Rosō (Shinzō Fukuhara and Rosō Fukuhara). Nihon no Shashinka 3. Tokyo: Iwanami, 1997. .
Hikari no shijō: Fukuhara Shinzō no sekai / The World of Shinzo Fukuhara: Poetics of Light. Tokyo: Shiseido Corporate Culture Department, 1994.  
Hikari no shijin: Fukuhara Shinzō, Nobutatsu, Nobuyoshi shashinten. Tokyo: Shiseido Corporate Culture Department, 1994.  
Hikari to sono kaichō: Fukuhara Shinzō, Fukuhara Rosō: 1913-nen – 1941-nen / The Light with Its Harmony: Shinzo Fukuhara / Roso Fukuhara: Photographs 1913–1941. Tokyo: Watari-um, 1992. . Text in Japanese and English.
 Niwa . Nihon shashinka jiten / 328 Outstanding Japanese Photographers. Kyoto: Tankōsha, 2000. . P.268.
 Iizawa, Kohtaro, and Hervé Chandès. Shinzo et Roso Fukuhara. Paris: Fondation Cartier pour l'art contemporain, 1994. .
Shinzo and Roso Fukuhara: Photographs by Ginza Modern Boys 1913–1941. New York: Sepia International, 2000.  Catalogue of an exhibition held at Sepia International, NYC, September–October 2000.
 Yamada Katsumi. Shashinka Fukuhara Shinzō no shoshin, 1883–1948 (The original purpose  of the photographer Shinzō Fukuhara, 1883–1948). Tokyo: Shiseido, distributed by Kyūryūdō, 2005. .

External links

 Shinzō and Rosō Fukuhara at Shiseido. A large collection of their photographs, and some other materials.

1883 births
1948 deaths
Columbia University alumni
Japanese photographers
People from Tokyo